The mountain elaenia (Elaenia frantzii) is a small passerine bird in the tyrant flycatcher family. It breeds in highlands from Guatemala to Colombia and western Venezuela. The scientific name celebrates the German physician and naturalist, Alexander von Frantzius.

Description

The upperparts are dull olive, with a narrow white eye ring. The wings are dusky with narrow yellow feather edges and two off-white wing bars. The throat and breast are yellowish grey, becoming dull yellow on the belly. Sexes are similar, but young birds are browner above, paler below and have brighter wing bars.

Subspecies
Four subspecies are recognized:
 Elaenia frantzii ultima – Griscom, 1935: found in Chiapas (southern Mexico), Guatemala, El Salvador and Honduras
 Elaenia frantzii frantzii – Lawrence, 1865: found in Nicaragua, Costa Rica and western Panama
 Elaenia frantzii browni – Bangs, 1898: found in northern Colombia and northwestern Venezuela
 Elaenia frantzii pudica – Sclater, PL, 1871: found in northern and eastern Colombia, northern and western Venezuela

Behaviour
This is an inconspicuous species, with a slurred peeeeur call, longer than that of mistletoe tyrannulet, and a repetitive d’weet d’weet song. It is solitary when not breeding.

Breeding

Its nest is a cup of mosses, liverworts and lichens, lined with plant fibres. The two cinnamon-blotched whitish eggs are incubated by the female for 15–16 days to hatching.

Feeding
It perches on a shaded watchpoint from which it sallies forth to pick insects, spiders, and many berries and seeds from foliage or even the ground. All its food is taken in flight.

References

Notes

Sources

External links

 
 
 
 

mountain elaenia
Birds of Honduras
Birds of Nicaragua
Birds of Costa Rica
Birds of Panama
Birds of the Colombian Andes
Birds of the Sierra Nevada de Santa Marta
Birds of the Venezuelan Coastal Range
mountain elaenia